Does Someone Have to Go? (originally Someone’s Gotta Go and Toxic Office) is an American reality television series that premiered on May 23, 2013 as a 2012–13 midseason replacement on Fox. It aired on Thursday nights at 9 pm ET/PT.

Format
Unscripted series about a workplace experiment in which employees are given complete control of the company by their bosses, allowing their staff the chance to make changes in the workplace, even if it means firing someone.

Episodes

References

External links

2010s American reality television series
2013 American television series debuts
2013 American television series endings
English-language television shows
Fox Broadcasting Company original programming